Canadian Forces Base Moose Jaw , also known as 15 Wing Moose Jaw, is a Canadian Forces base located  south of Moose Jaw, Saskatchewan. It is operated as an air force base by the Royal Canadian Air Force (RCAF) and is home to RCAF Pilot training and 431 Squadron, the Snowbirds, which is the RCAF's air demonstration squadron.

The base's airfield is named after Air Vice-Marshal Clifford McEwen and is one of only three military aerodromes in Canada to be named after an individual, Valcartier (W/C J.H.L. (Joe) Lecomte) Heliport and Cold Lake/Group Captain R.W. McNair Airport being the others.

The airport is classified as an airport of entry by Nav Canada and is staffed by the Canada Border Services Agency (CBSA). The customs service is restricted to 15 Wing – Moose Jaw aircraft only.

History 
A civilian flying club aerodrome was established on the site south-southwest of Moose Jaw in 1928 by the Moose Jaw Flying Club. Its location surrounded by flat open prairie proved to be an ideal training site.

RCAF Station Moose Jaw 
The declaration of World War II saw the Moose Jaw Flying Club initially contracted to provide pilot training for the Royal Canadian Air Force; however this was soon replaced by the far larger British Commonwealth Air Training Plan (BCATP) which saw the Government of Canada acquire the aerodrome and completely reconstruct it into RCAF Station Moose Jaw in 1940 with the new aerodrome opening in 1941.

Initially the Royal Air Force trained exclusively at the base under the RAF's No. 32 Service Flying Training School (SFTS) (ca. 1942) using Harvards, and later, Oxfords. No. 32 SFTS eventually broadened its intake to train 1,200 pilots for the air forces of Canada, the United Kingdom, Norway, New Zealand, Poland, France, Czechoslovakia, Belgium, the United States, and the Netherlands.

Aerodrome information  
Six runways were listed as follows:

RCAF Station Moose Jaw had two relief landing fields. One was located at Buttress, Saskatchewan and one at Burdick (Moose Jaw Municipal Airport) .

In 1946 RCAF Station Moose Jaw was decommissioned and the aerodrome was returned to civilian service.

Because of rising Cold War tensions, the aerodrome was reactivated by the RCAF in 1953 as the site of military pilot training. RCAF Station Moose Jaw undertook additional construction to support its expanded personnel complement. The base was used by the RCAF and its NATO allies for pilot training, using both single-prop World War II-era Harvards and Canadair CT-133 Silver Star jet training aircraft. By the mid-1960s these were both replaced by the Canadian built CT-114 Tutor.

The Institute for Stained Glass in Canada has documented the stained glass at RCAF Base Chapel.

CFB Moose Jaw 
In 1968 the RCAF merged with the Canadian Army and the Royal Canadian Navy to form the unified Canadian Forces. The base's name was changed to Canadian Forces Base Moose Jaw, usually shortened to CFB Moose Jaw. From 1968 until the formation of Air Command in 1975, CFB Moose Jaw fell under the direction of Training Command and served to house the Tutor Jet Training Program.

By the early 1990s, CFB Moose Jaw was operated by over 1,300 employees and made a significant economical impact on the region, but pending cutbacks in military spending spread rumours of possible closure of the base. In 1994, the Government of Canada awarded Bombardier with a 20-year contract to support the delivery of what is now the NATO Flying Training in Canada (NFTC) program. Many of the base's structures were renovated to accommodate new personnel and new training aircraft. Pilots from Denmark, Singapore, Great Britain, Italy, Hungary, Germany, Finland, and many other allied nations train at CFB Moose Jaw every year, ensuring the base's future with the Canadian Forces. In 2015, Bombardier sold its NFTC contract to CAE who are currently the prime contractor.

From 1970 until its disbandment in 1993 Moose Jaw had a Base Rescue Flight flying three CH-118 Huey helicopters.

During a reorganization at AIRCOM in the late 1990s, CFB Moose Jaw's various AIRCOM units were placed under a new primary lodger unit called "15 Wing"; consequently the base is now referred to as 15 Wing Moose Jaw.

Current operations

15 Wing Moose Jaw is home to the following units:

CFB Moose Jaw

Integral Units 
 15 Wing/NFTC Headquarters
 15 Wing Air Reserve Flight
 CFB Moose Jaw
 15 Operations Support Squadron
 15 Wing Air Traffic Control Flight
 Military Terminal Control Unit
 Military Aerodrome Control Unit
 2 Canadian Forces Flying Training School (2 CFFTS)
 431 Air Demonstration Squadron (also known as the "Snowbirds")

Canadian Armed Forces Lodger Units 
 23 Canadian Forces Health Services Centre, Detachment Moose Jaw
 1 Dental Unit, Detachment Moose Jaw
 Real Property Operations Unit - West, Detachment Moose Jaw
 Canadian Armed Forces Transition Centre, Detachment Moose Jaw
 14 Military Police Flight, 1 Military Police Squadron, Air Force Military Police Group

Other Lodger Units 

 Defence Construction Canada, Moose Jaw Regional Office
 Canadian Forces Morale and Welfare Services
 Personnel Support Program, Moose Jaw
 Canadian Forces Exchange System (CANEX)
 Military Family Resource Centre

NATO Flying Training in Canada (NFTC) 

 CAE Inc - Prime Contractor
 Serco - Air Traffic Control, Air Information Services, and Ground Electronic Services
 ATCO Frontec - Facilities Management, Vehicle and Logistics Services, Fire/Crash Rescue Services, Airfield Infrastructure, Flight Training Facilities

Southport Aerospace Centre

Integral Units 

 3 Canadian Forces Flying Training School (3 CFFTS) - Southport, Manitoba

Contracted Flying Training and Support (CFTS) 

 KF Aerospace - Prime Contractor
 Canadian Base Operators - Air Traffic Control, Fire and Crash Support, Airfield Maintenance, Food Services, Administrative Support, IMIT, Housekeeping and Aeronatuical Information Services
 Bluedrop Training & Simulation - Coursewear development
 Canadian Helicopters - Helicopter maintenance and ground-based and simulation instructors.

Future Aircrew Training Program (FAcT) 
The NATO Flying Training in Canada and Contracted Flying Training and Support contracts expire in 2027. Future Aircrew Training Program (FAcT) will replace these two contracts as well as create a new contracted system for Air Combat Systems Officers and Airborne Electronic Sensors Operators. After the REquest for proposals going out on 11 February 2022, the new contract is expected to be awarded in 2023.

Prospective bidders 

 SkyAlyne Canada Limited Partnership
 Primary Partners
 CAE Inc
 KF Aerospace
 Potential Sub-Contractors and Strategic Partners
 ATCO Frontec
 Bluedrop Training & Simulation
 Canadian Base Operators
 Canadian Helicopters
 Lockheed Martin
 PAL Aerospace
 Serco
 Babcock Leonardo Canadian Aircrew Training
 Primary Partners
 Babcock Canada
 Leonardo Canada
 Potential Sub-Contractors and Strategic Partners
 Top Aces
 Flight Safety International
 L3Harris
 Athabasca Catering
 The Loomex Group
 Executive Flight Centre
 Bird Construction
 Dexterra

See also 
 Moose Jaw (Dr. F. H. Wigmore Regional Hospital) Heliport
 List of airports in Saskatchewan

References

External links 
15 Wing – Moose Jaw
NATO Flying Training in Canada
Canadian Air Force Snowbirds Demonstration Team
Moose Jaw Flying Club
Encyclopedia of Saskatchewan

Canadian Forces bases in Saskatchewan
Military history of Saskatchewan
Royal Canadian Air Force stations
Airports of the British Commonwealth Air Training Plan
Military airbases in Saskatchewan
Buildings and structures in Moose Jaw
Moose Jaw No. 161, Saskatchewan
Transport in Moose Jaw